Bury South is a borough constituency represented in the House of Commons of the Parliament of the United Kingdom. At the 2019 General Election it was the 10th most marginal seat in the country, with a majority of 402 for the Conservative Party candidate Christian Wakeford. Wakeford defected to the Labour Party on 19 January 2022.

Constituency profile
The seat covers Prestwich, Whitefield and Radcliffe, towns that were absorbed into the Metropolitan Borough of Bury in 1974. The western border contains much of Bury's green belt land including Philips Park in Whitefield, Prestwich Clough and Drinkwater Park, making up 500 acres of green space. Prestwich and Whitefield are residential areas with one of the largest Jewish communities outside London. Radcliffe is a former mill town which declined after the loss of industry, with its only secondary school shut down; it is attempting regeneration as a commuter suburb and features a large park-and-ride Metrolink station. North Radcliffe includes Ainsworth, a rural area, along with Simister to the east of Prestwich which still has some farmland, now under threat from development. Overall this is an economically diverse area, as there are pockets of social housing in each town, while houses in areas such as Ringley Road in Whitefield, and Sheepfoot Lane in Prestwich, facing Heaton Park, can sell for over £1 million, with mostly owner-occupied semi-detached housing in between. The proportion of graduates and those employed in managerial/professional occupations is slightly above the national average.

At local elections, Prestwich mostly returns Labour and Liberal Democrat councillors, with some Conservative representation in Sedgley. Whitefield is a mix of safe Conservative and safe Labour, and Unsworth marginally Labour. Radcliffe was generally Labour with the exception of Radcliffe North. In 2019, the Conservatives gained their second Radcliffe North seat, and Labour lost both Radcliffe East and West wards to an independent local party, Radcliffe First.

Boundaries

1983–2010: The Metropolitan Borough of Bury wards of Besses, Holyrood, Pilkington Park, Radcliffe Central, Radcliffe North, Radcliffe South, St Mary's, and Sedgley.

2010–present: The Metropolitan Borough of Bury wards of Besses, Holyrood, Pilkington Park, Radcliffe East, Radcliffe North, Radcliffe West, St Mary's, Sedgley, and Unsworth.

The constituency was created in 1983 from parts of the former seats of Middleton and Prestwich & Bury and Radcliffe, both of which were Labour-Conservative marginals, held by Labour on slim majorities at the 1979 election. It covers the suburban towns of Radcliffe, Whitefield and Prestwich. The constituency does not contain any area of the town of Bury itself (which is in Bury North), apart from Unsworth, 
but only towns in the south of the Metropolitan Borough of Bury.

The seat was contested by future cabinet minister Hazel Blears in 1992, narrowly losing and would later be elected in her hometown in nearby Salford the following election until retiring in 2015. The 2017 General Election saw Robert Largan as the runner-up Conservative candidate, who would later be elected for High Peak at the following general election in 2019. 

The 2018 Boundary Commission proposals would have seen Bury South boundaries changed, once again becoming Middleton and Prestwich, taking Middleton from the existing Heywood and Middleton constituency and losing Radcliffe to a new Farnworth and Radcliffe constituency, while Unsworth becomes part of a newly created Bury constituency. These proposals have since been scrapped.

Members of Parliament

Elections

Elections in the 2010s

Elections in the 2000s

Elections in the 1990s

Elections in the 1980s

See also
 List of parliamentary constituencies in Greater Manchester

References

External links 
nomis Constituency Profile for Bury South — presenting data from the ONS annual population survey and other official statistics.

Parliamentary constituencies in Greater Manchester
Constituencies of the Parliament of the United Kingdom established in 1983
Politics of the Metropolitan Borough of Bury